The Harvard Graduate Council (HGC) (formerly known as the "HGSG" [defunct]), and originally founded as the HGC is the centralized student government organization for the twelve graduate schools of Harvard University. Representing the interests of more than 15,000 Harvard graduate students, HGC is responsible for advocating student concerns to the University administrators, including the President of Harvard University, as well as the Provost and the Deans. HGC is also tasked with organizing large university-wide initiatives and events, managing and providing funding for university-wide student groups (USGs), as well as representing the Harvard graduate student population during conferences with other Ivy League universities and external organizations. In addition, HGC collaborates with its undergraduate counterpart, the Harvard Undergraduate Council (UC). The HGC Seal is formed by 13 different Harvard seals. At the center is the main Harvard University seal, which itself is surrounded by the 12 smaller seals of individual graduate schools.

HGC is a steward of the "One Harvard" movement, which aims to bring all of Harvard's graduate schools together through joint advocacy, closer collaboration, and social interaction. HGC is a federal-like student government organization: it consists of representatives from all 12 graduate schools, but each of the twelve schools continues to operate some type of a local student council of its own. These local student councils focus on school-specific issues, whereas HGC's mandate extends to the entire university.

Governance

Membership
All matriculated students of Harvard's twelve graduate and professional schools are members of the HGC:
 Harvard Business School (HBS)
 Harvard Divinity School (HDS)
 Harvard Extension School (HES)
 Harvard Graduate School of Arts and Sciences (GSAS)
 Harvard Graduate School of Design (GSD)
 Harvard Graduate School of Education (HGSE)
 Harvard Kennedy School of Government (HKS)
 Harvard Law School (HLS)
 Harvard Medical School (HMS)
 Harvard School of Dental Medicine (HSDM)
 Harvard School of Engineering and Applied Sciences (SEAS)
 Harvard School of Public Health (HSPH)

Leadership
The governing body of the HGC is made of an Executive Board, School Representatives, and Committee Representatives. As of 2020, there were approximately 100 graduate and professional students serving on 7 committees and 23 subcommittees, within the Leadership Council. Leadership Council meetings are held throughout the fall and spring semesters, and are open to all students from Harvard’s graduate and professional schools.

The president of the Harvard Graduate Council is Carlos A. Gonzalez Sierra, (HKS/HLS) 2022-2023. The vice president is Mayank D. Kumar, (HDS) 2022-2023. The inaugural president of the Harvard Graduate Council is Beata Zolovska, (HMS) 2003-2004. The inaugural, *(executive) vice president is Gene Anthony III, (HDS) 2011.

Past Presidents
 Peter Choi (HMS), 2021-2022
 Chanthia Ma (HMS), 2020-2021
 Bryan O. Buckley (HSPH), 2019-2020
 Max Vani (GSAS), 2018-2019
 Kevin Tian (SEAS/GSAS), 2017-2018
 Peter Dyrud (GSAS/HKS), 2016-2017
 Mikal R. Mann (HGSE), 2015-2016
 Sudipta "Nila" Devanath (HLS), 2014-2015
 Philip Harding (HKS), 2013-2014
 Scott Chilton (GSAS), 2012-2013
 Joseph Pasqualichio (HBS), 2011-2012
 Pukar Malla (HKS), 2010-2011
 Aaron Chadbourne (HLS/HBS), 2009-2010
 Christopher Laconi (HKS/HBS), 2007-2009
 Cheng Zhu (HGSE), 2006-2007
 John Kalis (HDS), 2005-2006
 Mey Akashah (HSPH), 2004-2005
 Beata Zolovska-Lewis (HMS), 2003-2004

Past Vice Presidents
 Himaja Nagireddy (HSPH), 2021-2022
 Joshua Freundel (HLS), 2020-2021
 Chanthia Ma (HMS), 2019-2020
 Daniel Egel-Weiss (HLS), 2018-2019
 Aric Fleming (HDS), 2017-2018
 Simeon Bochev (HBS), 2016-2017
 Dolly Amaya (HGSE), 2015-2016
 Helene Reola (HBS), 2014-2015

Operations
University administrators often consult with the HGC on a variety of issues facing Harvard graduate students. HGC leadership also serves on various faculty-administrator-student committees and task forces, focusing on issues such as the student health care, campus planning, Harvard presidential appointments, and sexual assault.

University-wide Student Groups (USG)
The Harvard Graduate Council (HGC) provides operational and event grant funding for recognized
university wide student organizations through the University-wide Student Groups Sub-Committee
of the HGC Finance Committee.

2023-2024 USGs
 Arab Student Association
 Argentine Student Society
 Asian Pacific Coalition
 Augmented and Virtual Reality Student Alliance
 Black Graduate Student Alliance 
 Chinese Students and Scholars Association 
 Colombian Student Society 
 Ecuadorian Student Association 
 Effective Altruism Student Group
 India Student Group
 Italian Students Society
 Latino Student Alliance 
 Mexican Association of Students 
 Pakistan Student Group 
 Association of Peruvian Students
 Vegan Society Student Group

Events

HGC organizes university-wide events, including the Harvard-wide Welcome Back Event, the Harvard Masquerade Ball, Harvard Leadership Conference, Lectures That Last, and Post.Harvard.

References

External links
  Harvard Graduate Council

Harvard University
Student governments in the United States
Student political organizations in the United States